Phi Epsilon Kappa is a national professional fraternity for persons engaged in or pursuing careers in the fields of physical education, health, recreation, dance, human performance, exercise science, sports medicine and sports management.

History
Phi Epsilon Kappa was founded on April 12, 1913 at the Normal College of the American Gymnastics Union in Indianapolis, Indiana. In 1920, the second charter, Beta, was granted to the American College of Physical Education (Chicago, Illinois), whose charter was later moved to DePaul University when that institution assimilated American College.

Phi Epsilon Kappa extended membership to women beginning in 1975.

Since its founding, Phi Epsilon Kappa has installed over one hundred collegiate chapters and twenty-three alumni chapters.

Phi Epsilon Kappa joined the Professional Interfraternity Conference in 1928, remaining a member of the PIC through at least 1968. However, Baird's Manual of 1991 lists them as an independent professional fraternity.

Objectives and Traditions
The national fraternity notes seven objectives:
To be organized and operated exclusively for educational and charitable purposes as a non-profit organization dedicated to advancement of those educational interest areas of Physical Education, Health, Recreation, Dance, Human Performance, Exercise Science, Sports Medicine, and Sports Management.
To foster scientific research.
To facilitate the exchange of information and experience gained in the various countries of the world including programs, methods, techniques, materials, training and research.
To provide a medium through which the membership can contribute to the advancement of the profession.
To publish periodicals to be distributed to members and to the general public for the purpose of disseminating information about the corporation, the membership, and the profession.
To make awards for outstanding work.
To foster a spirit of loyalty and fraternity and bonds of fellowship and mutual assistance.

The principal publication of the Fraternity is The Physical Educator, a professional journal published four times annually and originally published in 1940.

The Fraternity's esoteric manual is Black and Gold, published three times annually.

Chapters
Early chapter list through Beta Delta chapter installed in 1961 is from Baird's Manual, 1968 edition. Later chapters identified from national website that shows active chapters along with recently inactive chapters, but does not provide a comprehensive listing of all inactive chapters. Unverified chapter names that fit within the alphabetical progression of names are listed with a "?" waiting for confirmation that those names were actually used.

1913 Alpha, Normal College of the American Gymnastic Union, Indianapolis, IN
1920 Beta, American College of Physical Education, Chicago, Chicago 
1921 Gamma, Temple, Philadelphia, PA (20xx)
1923 Delta, Panzer College, NJ (1943)
1924 Epsilon, Akron, OH (1937)
1924 Zeta, Columbia, New York City, NY (20xx) 
1924 Eta, Trenton State, NJ (20xx) 
1925 Theta, Wisconsin, Madison, WI (20xx) 
1925 Iota, Iowa (20xx) 
1925 Kappa, Michigan, Ann Arbor, MI (20xx)
1926 Lambda, UCLA (20xx) 
1926 Mu, Ithaca (20xx)
1926 Nu, Wisconsin State, LaCrosse, WI (20xx)
1927 Xi, Wyoming (20xx) 
1928 Omicron, Oregon (20xx)
1928 Pi, Montana (20xx)
1929 Rho, Illinois (20xx)
1930 Sigma, Minnesota (20xx)
1930 Tau, Nebraska (20xx)
1930 Upsilon, Cincinnati (20xx)
1930 Phi, Kansas State (20xx)
1931 Chi, Occidental (20xx)
1931 Psi, Ohio Wesleyan (20xx) 
1932 Omega, Ohio State (1936) 
1934 Alpha Alpha, Indiana (20xx)
1934 Alpha Beta, Pennsylvania State College, State College, PA (20xx)
1934 Alpha Gamma, Washington State College, Pullman, WA (20xx)
1934 Alpha Delta, Kent State University, Kent, OH (20xx)
1935 Sigma Alpha, University of Southern California, Los Angeles, CA (1952)
1939 Alpha Epsilon, San Jose State  (20xx)
1941 Alpha Zeta, Boston (1956) 
1943 Alpha Eta, Manhattan, NY
1948 Alpha Theta, Utah State (1953) 
1949 Alpha Iota, Miami (Ohio) 
1949 Alpha Kappa, North Dakota (20xx)
1949 Alpha Lambda, Wake Forest (20xx)
1950 Alpha Mu, Michigan State 
1950 Alpha Nu, Buffalo (20xx)
1950 Alpha Xi, Brooklyn (20xx)
1950 Alpha Omicron, Syracuse (20xx)
1951 Alpha Pi, Northeast State, Monroe, LA (20xx) 
1951 Alpha Rho, Cal State, LA (20xx)
1953 Alpha Sigma, College of the Pacific, CA (20xx)
1953 Alpha Tau, Bowling Green, OH (20xx)
1956 Alpha Upsilon, Washington (20xx)
1956 Alpha Phi, Arizona State, Tempe, AZ (20xx)
1956 Alpha Chi, Southeastern Louisiana, Hammond, LA (20xx)
1957 Alpha Psi, Kansas (20xx)
1957 Alpha Omega, Idaho (20xx)
1957 Beta Alpha, Long Beach State, CA (20xx)
1958 Beta Beta, Florida State (20xx)
1960 Beta Gamma, Texas Tech (20xx)
1961 Beta Delta, Central Michigan
19xx Beta Epsilon - Slippery Rock State University
1962 Beta Iota - East Carolina University (20xx)
19xx Beta Pi - College at Brockport (NY)
19xx Beta Tau - Indiana State University (20xx)
19xx Beta Omega - East Stroudsburg (20xx)
19xx Gamma Alpha - West Chester State University. (PA)
19xx Gamma Beta - Texas A&M University
19xx Gamma Epsilon - University of Missouri
1969 Gamma Zeta - Grambling State University (LA)
19xx Gamma Mu - Shepherd University (WV)
19xx Gamma Omicron - Grand Valley State University (20xx)
19xx Gamma Tau - Indiana University Pennsylvania
19xx Delta Alpha - Hope College (MI)
19xx Delta Beta - Ohio Northern University (20xx)
19xx Delta Gamma - James Madison University (VA)
19xx Delta Delta - Arkansas State University
19xx Delta Epsilon - University of North Carolina Wilmington
19xx Delta Zeta - Auburn University
19xx Delta Eta - Adelphi University (NY)
19xx Delta Theta - Ft. Hays State University (KS)
19xx Delta Iota - Middle Tennessee State University
19xx Delta Kappa - University of West Georgia
19xx Delta Lambda ?
19xx Delta Mu ?
19xx Delta Nu - University of Toledo
19xx Delta Xi - Edinboro University (20xx)
19xx Delta Omicron - Anderson University (IN)
19xx Delta Pi - Barry University (20xx)
19xx Delta Rho?
19xx Delta Sigma - Troy State University (AL)
19xx Delta Tau - University of Pittsburgh Bradford (PA)
19xx Delta Upsilon - Nebraska Wesleyan
19xx Delta Phi ?
19xx Delta Chi - Truman State University (MO)
19xx Delta Psi - Winthrop University (20xx)
19xx Delta Omega?
19xx Epsilon Alpha - Western Michigan
19xx Epsilon Beta - Ursinus College (20xx)
19xx Epsilon Gamma- Missouri Western State College
19xx Epsilon Delta - Keene State College (NH)
19xx Epsilon Epsilon ?
19xx Epsilon Zeta - Tarleton State University (TX)
19xx Epsilon Eta - Florida Southern College
1999 Epsilon Theta - Salisbury State University (MD)
19xx Epsilon Iota?
19xx Epsilon Kappa?
19xx Epsilon Lambda ?
19xx Epsilon Mu? 
19xx Epsilon Nu?
19xx Epsilon Xi?
19xx Epsilon Omicron - University of Florida
19xx Epsilon Pi - McMurry University (TX)
19xx Epsilon Rho?
19xx Epsilon Sigma - Marywood University (PA)
 Epsilon Lambda - Towson University (MD) 
2003 Epsilon Tau - West Liberty University (20xx) 
20xx Epsilon Upsilon - Hardin-Simmons University (20xx)
20xx Epsilon Phi - Messiah College (20xx)
20xx Epsilon Chi?
20xx Epsilon Psi - Longwood University
20xx Epsilon Omega - Oklahoma City University
20xx Zeta Alpha - Olivet College (20xx)
2004 Zeta Beta - Plymouth State University
2004 Zeta Gamma - University oi Scranton
20xx Zeta Delta - Highpoint University (20xx)
20xx Zeta Epsilon?
20xx Zeta Zeta - Jackson State University (MS)
20xx Zeta Eta - Wingate University (20xx)
20xx Zeta Theta - Albion College (MI)
20xx Zeta Iota - Fairmont University (20xx)
20xx Zeta Kappa - Auburn University Montgomery (AL)
20xx Zeta Lambda - Whittier College (CA)
2006 Zeta Mu - Texas A&M Kingsville
20xx Zeta Nu - Mitchell College (CT)
20xx Zeta Xi - Johnson C. Smith University (NC)
20xx Zeta Omicron - Eastern Michigan University (20xx)
20xx Zeta Pi - West Virginia University (20xx)
20xx Zeta Rho?
20xx Zeta Sigma - Berea College (KY)
20xx Zeta Tau - Immaculate University (PA)
20xx Zeta Upsilon?
20xx Zeta Phi - California State Chico (20xx)
20xx Zeta Chi - Linfield College (OR) (20xx)
20xx Zeta Psi - Tennessee Tech University
20xx Zeta Omega - Lynchburg College (VA)
20xx Eta Alpha - North Carolina Central University
20xx Eta Beta - University of Louisiana Monroe
20xx Eta Gamma - University of Indianapolis
20xx Eta Delta - North Carolina A&T State University
20xx Eta Epsilon?
20xx Eta Zeta - Salem State University
20xx Eta Theta - Concordia University (NE)
20xx Eta Iota - Ouachita University (AR)
20xx Eta Kappa - University oi The Pacific
20xx Eta Lambda - Cardinal Stritch College (20xx)
20xx Eta Mu - Stephen F. Austin State University
20xx Eta Nu - Emporia State University
20xx Eta Xi - Shenandoah University
20xx Eta Omicron - Jacksonville University
20xx Eta Pi - Morehouse College
20xx Eta Rho - Central Connecticut University
20xx Eta Sigma - University of Dayton (OH)
20xx Eta Tau - Chowan University (NC)
20xx Eta Upsilon - Endicott College (MA)
20xx Eta Phi - University of Wyoming
20xx Eta Chi - Delaware State University
20xx Eta Psi - Southern Connecticut University
20xx Eta Omega - Concordia University Irvine (CA)
2014 Theta Alpha - Evangel University (MO)
2015 Theta Beta - Prairie View A&M University (TX)
2019 Theta Omicron - University of Central Arkansas (AR) 
2020 Theta Tau - University of La Verne (CA)

See also
Professional fraternities and sororities

References

Fraternities and sororities in the United States
Professional fraternities and sororities in the United States
Student organizations established in 1913
1913 establishments in Indiana
Former members of Professional Fraternity Association